Wojtek Fibak and Tom Okker were the defending champions, but lost in the first round this year.

Heinz Günthardt and Bob Hewitt won the title, defeating David Carter and Chris Lewis 7–6, 6–1 in the final.

Seeds

  Heinz Günthardt /  Bob Hewitt (champions)
  Wojtek Fibak /  Tom Okker (first round)
  Željko Franulović /  Jan Kodeš (first round)
  Jürgen Fassbender /  Pavel Složil (quarterfinals)

Draw

Draw

External links
Draw

1980 Grand Prix (tennis)
1980 BMW Open